Pachuta Creek is a stream in the U.S. state of Mississippi.

Pachuta is a name derived from the Choctaw language purported to mean "pigeons roost there". A variant transliteration is "Patchuta Creek".

References

Rivers of Mississippi
Rivers of Clarke County, Mississippi
Rivers of Jasper County, Mississippi
Mississippi placenames of Native American origin